The Matador is a 2008 documentary film about David Fandila's quest to become the world's top-ranked bullfighter. It first premiered at the South by Southwest Film Festival and had since met with mostly positive reviews.

The film follows Fandila's three-year journey into bullfighting history as the violent cultural tradition is questioned.

References

External links
 
 
 
 
 
 

2008 films